is a Japanese manga series, created by Towa Oshima, which was originally serialized in Futabasha's Weekly Manga Action magazine from 2001, and then subsequently Comic High! from 2004.

It was adapted in 2006 into an anime television series, entitled , which premiered in Japan on April 3, 2006, and completed its 12-episode run on June 19, 2006. It was produced by Genco, animated by ARMS, written by Hideki Shirane, and directed by Yoshitaka Fujimoto (director of the anime Cyber Team in Akihabara and Nuku Nuku TV).

A Girl's High PlayStation 2 video game,  was made and released in late September, 2006.

The manga series was published in North America by DrMaster (formerly ComicsOne), whereas the anime was distributed across the region by Media Blasters, which released the series under the name Girl's High. The series premiered on Toku in the United States in January 2016.

Plot
Eriko and her friends Yuma and Ayano are excited about entering their first year of high school at Yamasaki Academy. Their excitement leads to their breaking of the rules when they toured the school before the opening ceremony. They find out their preconceptions about the school may not be as true as they had first thought. Despite that, Eriko and her friends are joined by new friends. They aim to get through high school life together.

Characters

Main characters
 
 
The happy-go-lucky main character of the story, Eriko gets good grades but is nevertheless quite clumsy and not at all athletically coordinated (unless it is to escape the many perverts who often cross her path). She tends to be the main victim of the perverted actions (accidental or not) of Odagiri, though she occasionally uses this to blackmail him. Described a few times as "A nosy busybody", Eriko tends to go out of her way to find out people's problems. She's also quite fickle. Eriko is frightened of injections.
 
 
 Eriko's friend since middle-school. The two got off to a bad start, but found they had interests in common. Yuma has dyed blonde hair. Yuma has made a career of being the school's best cheater, although she still gets bad grades. She has a younger sister, Momoka. Yuma often pairs up with Eriko, such as in Episode 2 and Episode 7. She is the most short-tempered of the group. Her bunches are something of a trademark, as Odagiri didn't recognize her from behind when she wore it in a bun. She tends to lack in prudence, and ever willing to have fun.
 
 
 Yuma's life-long friend. They are very close. Ayano is the ingenue of the group. She wears glasses and her hair in plaits, implying an innocent personality, though she has a vivid imagination which often leads to perverted fantasies (as hinted in her eyecatch). By far the most dim-witted of the group, but out of all the main characters, she is the only one with a steady boyfriend (Takanori Shimotakatani). She often is victim to getting hit by the others for PDA's.
 
 
 A very rich girl (as seen in her designer accessories from Gucci, Cartier and Prada), Akari is at first a rival to Eriko's group, but she quickly becomes friends with them after they brag about going to school with boys. An "insider" (a girl who transfers from the junior high branch of the private school rather than passing an entrance exam, like Eriko and friends did, to get in) who uses her knowledge of the school ways to show the others the ropes. Kouda aspires to become a famous actress, using all of her energy to be as outrageous as possible, so as to leave a lasting impression. She has the habit of dressing in completely bizarre outfits to gain attention, only to change into more normal clothes a split second later.
 
 
 A friend of Akari's who is the first person that the girls know in their age group who loses her virginity. She is assumed part of Eriko's "Moron Group" much to her chagrin. Himeji is often flippant in her sex life, letting guys get the better of her, since she is easily tempted. She used to be overweight, but her crush on Odagiri gave her the incentive to lose weight. She is the most protective of Ogawa, and has the largest breasts, much to Kouda's chagrin.
 
 
 A close friend of Kyoko's, which makes her a member of the group by default. She is the cute, petite girl of the group who acts as young as she looks. ikue usually comes up with the stupidest, almost Mr. Bean-ish solutions (giving Eriko a "mini sleeping pill" to help her relax because she had been up all night watching Doraemon videos) and games (spilling floor wax and using the cloth to slide on). She loves candy and is very fond of sleeping. She calls Kyoko 'Hime-chan' and appears fond of her. Ikue is the daughter of a drugstore's owner.

Supporting characters
 
 
 The deluded science teacher who believes that he is attractive simply because he is one of the youngest male teachers at Saki Girl's. Often the butt of many pranks by Eriko and her group, Himeji used to have a crush on him before she discovered how vain he is. Chapter 69 is told from his point of view, showing him to be far less vain and perverted than the girls believe him to be.
 
 The desperate male math teacher of Saki Girl's. Constantly seen wearing an out-dated 1970s style leisure suit (which is later burned at a school bonfire), decidedly elected as "The teacher who most likely needs Viagra".
 
 Female Health Ed. teacher at Saki Girl's. A bitter older woman who always seems to have a scowl on her face. She dyes her hair black to cover her grays (even though hair dyeing is against the Saki Girl's rules).
 
 
 The hairy, muscular, infallible P.E. teacher at Saki Girl's who has taken a liking to Eriko.
 
 Curiously named Head & classics teacher.
 
 
 Ayano's boyfriend whom she met at the "Meet the Boys" festival. Eriko and pals, as well as Ayano's mother and sister, are usually trying to get Ayano to lose her virginity to him, mostly without the couple's consent. He is a fan of Takeshi Kouda(Kouda's older brother) He has a glasses fetish.
 
 
 Yuma's delinquent, tsundere and near-evil younger sister, who harbors a hatred for Yuma and her friends, but later befriends Yuma's friends. She is often mistaken as a celebrity, and she uses to manipulate people and flirt with boys. The cause of her poor relationship is because Yuma always protect Momoka and she felt useless, so she refused to go to the same school that her sister, causing their bad relationship. It is later shown that although she claims to dislike her sister, Momoka truly loves her sister and misses her when Yuma is away on a trip, and vice versa. Later, her sibling relation with Yuma gets better in the series, and finally she goes to her sister's high school, making their relationship good again.
 
 
 Ayano's attractive, unlucky in love older sister. It is somewhat hinted that she and Ayano had different fathers.
 
 
 Ayano's unattractive mother, owner of Bar Choko. Also unlucky in love.
 
 Akari's elder brother, trying to make it big as a rock star. Unemployed and a womanizer, although he has been seen to occasionally date Ayano's sister Fumino.

Episodes

Music
Opening theme Kirameku performed by yozuca

Ending theme incl. performed by meg rock

ISBN
English translations published by ComicsOne
 Volume 1: 
 Volume 2: 
English translations published by Dr. Master Productions Inc.
 Volume 3: 
 Volume 4: 
 Volume 5: 
 Volume 6: 
 Volume 7: 
 Volume 8: 
 Volume 9:  (28 March 2008)

References

External links
  at Futabasha 
  
 

2001 manga
2006 Japanese television series debuts
2006 Japanese television series endings
Anime series
Arms Corporation
ComicsOne titles
Futabasha manga
Manga series
School life in anime and manga
Seinen manga
Japanese high school television series
Video games developed in Japan
AT-X (TV network) original programming